The Beacon Way is a long-distance walk of around  through the West Midlands county and Staffordshire, in the Midlands of England. It takes its name from Barr Beacon, a hill to the east of Walsall, and one of the highest points in the West Midlands. The Beacon Way starts at Sandwell Park Farm in Sandwell Valley Country Park and extends as far as Gentleshaw Common where it connects with the Heart of England Way.

External links
 Long Distance Walkers' Association
 Ramblers Association page on the Beacon Way
 Heart of England Way Association pages / web site

Footpaths in Staffordshire
Footpaths in the West Midlands (county)
Long-distance footpaths in England